Mary A. Carskadon is one of the most prominent American researchers in sleep. She is a Professor in the Department of Psychiatry and Human Behavior at the Warren Alpert Medical School of Brown University.  She is also the Director of the Sleep and Chronobiology Research Lab at E.P. Bradley Hospital.  She is considered to be an expert on sleep and circadian rhythms during childhood, adolescence and young adulthood. She researches issues related to daytime sleepiness.  She has also contributed important research on school start times as it relates to sleep patterns and sleepiness in adolescence. Every summer, Dr. Carskadon offers a prestigious summer internship for highly motivated students interested in sleep research at the Bradley Sleep Lab. These students, known as Dement Fellows, after William C. Dement, work in the sleep lab for the entirety of the summer and learn under Dr. Carskadon.

Career

Carskadon studied psychology at Gettysburg College and graduated in 1969.  She received a Ph.D. in neuro- and biobehavioral sciences in 1979 at Stanford University.  At Stanford, she studied under William C. Dement.  Along with Dement, she developed the Multiple Sleep Latency Test (MSLT) used to clinically determine sleepiness in sleep disordered patients, particularly by measuring daytime sleep onset latency. Carskadon started her own research group at Brown University in 1985.  Her research in adolescent sleep/wake behavior has resulted in proposed changes in public policy.  This research suggests that circadian rhythms shift during adolescence and that secondary schools should have later start times.

Each summer, Carskadon's lab hosts adolescents who live in the sleep lab for 14 days.  The adolescents participate in summer camp-like activities while their sleep is monitored each night.

Carskadon has received many awards for her research including the Nathaniel Kleitman Distinguished Service Award of the American Sleep Disorders Association (1991), the Lifetime Achievement Award of the National Sleep Foundation (2003), Mark O. Hatfield Public Policy Award of the American Academy of Sleep Medicine (2003), and the Outstanding Educator Award of the Sleep Research Society (2005).  The Sleep Research Society has since renamed the award the Mary A. Carskadon Outstanding Educator Award. The Association of Polysomnographic Technologists also presents the Carskadon Award for Research Excellence to a member each year.  In 2007 she was presented with the Distinguished Scientist Award by the Sleep Research Society.  She is a past president of the Sleep Research Society (1999–2000) and founder of the Northeast Sleep Society (1986).

Carskadon has published many research articles and book chapters.  In addition she has edited or co-edited several books such as The Encyclopedia of Sleep and Dreaming, Sleep Medicine, and Adolescent Sleep Patterns:  Biological, Social, and Psychological Influences.

References

External links
Carskadon Biography, Brown Medical School
Carskadon Biography, Bradley Hasbro Children's Research Center

Sleep researchers
Gettysburg College alumni
Stanford University alumni
Brown University faculty
Living people
Year of birth missing (living people)
Chronobiologists
American women scientists
American women academics
American women neuroscientists
American neuroscientists